Cyril Thomas Osthoff (born November 8, 1936) is an American politician in the state of Minnesota. He served in the Minnesota House of Representatives.

References

1936 births
Living people
Members of the Minnesota House of Representatives
University of Minnesota alumni
People from Ramsey County, Minnesota